Kalyanpur Assembly constituency is an assembly constituency in Purvi Champaran district in the Indian state of Bihar.

Overview
As per orders of Delimitation of Parliamentary and Assembly constituencies Order, 2008, 16. Kalyanpur Assembly constituency is composed of the following: Kotwa community development block; Parsauni Wazid, Bakhri, Kalyanpur, Barharwa Mahanand, Siswa Shobh, Brindaban, Pakari Dixit, Siswa Kharar, Patna, Gariba, Shambhu Chak, Sitalpur, Koela Belwa, Bhuwan Chhapra, Banshghat, North Gawandra, South Gawandra and Mani Chhapra gram panchayats of Kalyanpur CD Block.

Kalyanpur Assembly constituency is part of 3. Purvi Champaran (Lok Sabha constituency).

Members of Legislative Assembly

Election results
In the November 08 2015 state assembly elections, Sachindra singh bhartiya janta party(BJP) won the newly created 16 Kalyanpur assembly seat defeating her nearest rival  Raziya khatoon of janta dal united(JDU).

2020

References

External links
 

Assembly constituencies of Bihar
Politics of East Champaran district